Hāwea Flat is a rural settlement in the Queenstown-Lakes District of the South Island of New Zealand. Lake Hāwea is 5 km north. The area was named for Hāwea-i-te-raki, an ancestor of the Ngāti Hāwea hapū. The macron was officially added to the place name in 2010.

Demographics
Hāwea Flat is described by Statistics New Zealand as a rural settlement. It is part of the Upper Clutha Valley statistical area. 

Hāwea Flat had a population of 543 at the 2018 New Zealand census, an increase of 141 people (35.1%) since the 2013 census, and an increase of 264 people (94.6%) since the 2006 census. There were 180 households. There were 273 males and 267 females, giving a sex ratio of 1.02 males per female, with 144 people (26.5%) aged under 15 years, 57 (10.5%) aged 15 to 29, 315 (58.0%) aged 30 to 64, and 27 (5.0%) aged 65 or older.

Ethnicities were 97.8% European/Pākehā, 7.7% Māori, 0.6% Asian, and 1.7% other ethnicities (totals add to more than 100% since people could identify with multiple ethnicities).

Although some people objected to giving their religion, 72.4% had no religion, 18.2% were Christian, 1.1% were Hindu, 1.1% were Buddhist and 2.2% had other religions.

Of those at least 15 years old, 132 (33.1%) people had a bachelor or higher degree, and 33 (8.3%) people had no formal qualifications. The employment status of those at least 15 was that 234 (58.6%) people were employed full-time and 78 (19.5%) were part-time.

Education
Hāwea Flat School is a contributing primary school for years 1 to 6 with a roll of  students as of  The school opened in 1882.

References

External links
History of Hāwea

Populated places in Otago
Queenstown-Lakes District